Aristeguietia gayana, or asmachilca, is a bush that grows up to 1 meter in height. It grows in the west-facing mountainsides and interandean valleys between 3600–4000 meters in altitude.

Asmachilca is only found in Peru. It was traditionally used by the Incas for respiratory system complaints.  Today, it is used in cooking, but tea is the most common preparation.

References

External links

gayana
Flora of Peru